The Infernal Trio (also known as Lady of Hell) is a 1974 crime comedy horror film directed by Francis Girod from a screenplay he co-wrote with Jacques Rouffio, based on the novel Le Trio infernal by Solange Fasquelle.

Cast
 Michel Piccoli as Georges Sarret
 Romy Schneider as Philomena Schmidt
 Mascha Gonska as Catherine Schmidt
 Philippe Brizard as Chambon
 Jean Rigaux as Villette
 Monica Fiorentini as Magali
 Hubert Deschamps as Detreuil
  as the nurse
 Andréa Ferréol as Noémie
  as the doctor
 Pierre Dac as the insurance doctor
 Papinou as Luffeaux
 Henri Piccoli the violinist

References

External links
 
 
 
 The Infernal Trio at UCM.ONE

1974 films
1970s crime comedy films
1974 horror films
Films based on French novels
Films set in the 1930s
Films set in Marseille
French crime comedy films
German crime comedy films
Italian crime comedy films
French horror films
German horror films
Italian horror films
West German films
1970s French films
1970s Italian films
1970s German films